Loira or Lòira is an alternative spelling of Loire, a river in France.

Loira may also refer to:

 Loira, Galiza, one of the Rivers of Galicia in Spain
 Loira, Tasmania, a locality in Tasmania, Australia
 Loira, Valdoviño, a parroquia in Valdoviño, Spain